Friedrich König may refer to:

Friedrich Koenig (1774–1833), German inventor
Friedrich König (painter) (1857–1941), Austrian artist
Friedrich Eduard König (1846–1936), German Protestant theologian and Semitic scholar

See also
König (disambiguation)